Nöbbele is a locality situated in Växjö Municipality, Kronoberg County, Sweden with 257 inhabitants in 2010.

Sister cities
 Shafer - Minnesota, USA

References 

Populated places in Kronoberg County
Populated places in Växjö Municipality
Värend